Nejc Kuhar (born October 19, 1985) is a Slovenian ski mountaineer.

Kuhar was born in Ljubljana. He started ski mountaineering in 2000 and competed first in the Rally Jezersko event in 2001. He has been member of the national selection since 2004 and lives in Kokra.

Selected results 
 2006:
 4th, World Championship team race (together with Anže Šenk, Jernej Karničar and Tomaž Soklič)
 2009:
 9th, European Championship combination ranking
 2010:
 6th, World Championship relay race (together with Anže Šenk, Matjaž Mikloša and Klemen Triler)
 10th, World Championship team race (together with Anže Šenk)
 1st, Mountain Attack tour
 2011:
 7th, World Championship relay, together with Anže Šenk, Matjaž Mikloša and Klemen Triler
 8th, World Championship vertical race
 4th, Trofeo Mezzalama, together with Alessandro Follador and Thomas Trettel
 2012:
 3rd, Sellaronda Skimarathon, together with Filippo Beccari
 8th, Pierra Menta, together with Filippo Beaccari

References

External links 
 Nejc Kuhar at skimountaineering.org

1985 births
Living people
Slovenian male ski mountaineers
Sportspeople from Ljubljana
Slovenian sky runners